John Irvin Langhoff (August 24, 1897 – January 12, 1952) was a player in the National Football League for the Racine Legion in 1922 and 1923. He played at the collegiate level at Marquette University.

Biography
Langhoff was born on August 24, 1897 in Milwaukee, Wisconsin. He died there in 1952.

References

1897 births
1952 deaths
American football running backs
Racine Legion players
Marquette Golden Avalanche football players
Players of American football from Milwaukee